Careya arborea is a species of tree in the Lecythidaceae family, native to the Indian subcontinent, Afghanistan, and Indochina. Its common English names include wild guava, Ceylon oak, patana oak. Its leaves turn red in the cold season. Flowers are yellow or white in colour that become large green berries. The tree grows throughout India in forests and grasslands.

Common names

Assamese - Godhajam কুম Kum, kumari, কুম্ভী kumbhi
 Bengali - Vakamba, Kumhi, Kumbhi
 Burmese - ban bwe (ဘန့်ပွေး)
 Garo - Dimbil bol
 Hindi - कुम्भी Kumbhi
 Kannada - alagavvele, daddal, Koulu mara
 Khasi - Ka Mahir, Soh Kundur
 Khmer - Kandaol (កណ្ដោល)
 Malayalam - പേഴ് Peezh, Peelam, Pela, Paer, Alam
 Marathi - कुम्भा Kumbha
 Oriya - Kumbh
 Sanskrit - Bhadrendrani, गिरिकर्णिका Girikarnika, Kaidarya, कालिंदी Kalindi
 Sinhala - Kahata 
 Tamil - பேழை Peezhai, Aima, Karekku, Puta-tanni-maram
 Telugu - araya, budatadadimma, budatanevadi, buddaburija
 Thai - kradone (กระโดน)
 Vietnamese - Vừng (sometimes Vừng xoan)

Uses
In colonial times in India, the fibrous bark of this tree was found to be an ideal substitute for beech bark as matches for matchlocks.

The Careya arborea leaves are traditionally used to roll cheroots in Myanmar (Burma). The town of Pyay (formerly Prome) is known for a local delicacy known as taw laphet or  laphet that is tightly packed in parcel-like Careya arborea leaves for fermentation and preservation purposes.

Flowers and young leaves are eaten as salad greens in Thailand. Young fruit is reported to be edible, though seeds are slightly poisonous.

Gallery

See also 
 Pīlu

References

Lecythidaceae
Flora of Afghanistan
Flora of the Indian subcontinent
Flora of Indo-China
Inflorescence vegetables